The following is a timeline of the history of the city of Zagreb, Croatia.

Prior to 19th century

 1st century – Andautonia was founded
 5th century – Andautonia was destroyed
 1094 – Diocese of Zagreb established by Ladislaus I of Hungary; Cathedral construction begins (approximate date).
 1242
 Gradec and Gornji Grad besieged by Tatars.
 Golden Bull issued by Béla IV of Hungary; Gradec becomes a royal free city.
 1261 – Gradec fortification walls constructed.
 1368 – Population: 2,810.
 1476 – Works begin on Kaptol fortification in August. Bishop Osvald of Zagreb Diocese permits residence of laypeople in Kaptol for defense purposes, leading to resistance among clergy.
 1479 – Kaptol fortification walls completed.
 1557 – Croatian Parliament convenes at Gradec.
 1573 – Matija Gubec, leader of the failed Croatian–Slovene peasant revolt, is executed.
 1607
 Jesuit high school founded.
 National library founded.
 1621 – Zagreb designated seat of Ban of Croatia.
 1631 - Building of the students' seminary completed
 1632 – St. Catherine's Church built.
 1647 – Foundation directed towards financing poor students from Croatian regions, Frangepaneum, established by Nikola IX Frankopan
 1651 – Catastrophic flood of Medveščak stream in July destroys all houses in Tkalčićeva Street. 52 people drown.
 1662 – Zrinski palace built
 1669 – Jesuit Academy established.
 1670 – Fran Krsto Frankopan, poet and conspirator, visits the city in order to secure support from the citizens during the Magnate conspiracy
 1695 – Pavao Ritter Vitezović starts writing and publishing pamphlets, poetic, historiographical works on Saint Mark's Square
 1742 – Population: 5,600.
 1757 – Tituš Brezovački, notable dramatist and poet is born
 1758 - First Croatian arithmetics textbook Arithmetika Horvatzka, written by Mihalj Šilobod Bolšić, was published
 1764 - Vojković palace built
 1771 – Ephemerides Zagrabienses, the first Croatian newspaper, begins publication.
 1776 – Royal council relocates to Zagreb from Varaždin.
 1785 – The first bridge over Sava river is built.
 1786 – A large fire sweeps through Gradec, Kaptol and Tkalčićeva Street.
 1794
 Maksimir Park opens to the public
 Construction begins on foundation hospital on Harmica square (today's Ban Jelačić Square)
 1797 – Amadeo's theatre founded.

19th century
 1805 – Population: 7,706.
 1827 – Musikverein founded.
 1829 – Music school established by Agram Musical Society.
 1833 – City Hall rebuilt.
 1835 – Novine Horvatzke newspaper begins publication.
 1845 – July 29: Protest quelled by Austrian Imperial Army.
 1846
 Sisters of Charity Hospital established.
 Franz Liszt visits Zagreb and performs in the old theatre on St. Mark's Square.
 1850
 Telegraph service is introduced.
 Population: 16,036.
 1851
 Janko Kamauf becomes mayor.
 Gradec and Zagreb merged.
 1852 – Roman Catholic Archdiocese established.
 1860 – National Theatre established.
 1862 – Railway begins operating.
 1866 – Orthodox Cathedral built.
 1867
 City designated capital of Croatia-Slavonia.
 Synagogue consecrated.
 1871 – Philharmonic Orchestra founded.
 1874 - Franz Josef University founded.
 1875 - Art Society founded.
 1876 – Mirogoj Cemetery established.
 1877 – Grič cannon begins daily firing.
 1878 – Waterworks begin operating.
 1880
 Earthquake.
 Museum of Arts and Crafts founded.
 1882 – Vranyczany Palace built.
 1884 – Strossmayer Gallery of Old Masters opens.
 1887 – Public telephone network is established.
 1889 – Rudolf barracks completed.
 1890 – Population: 38,742.
 1891
 The first Zagreb tramway, a horsecar, begins operating.
 Botanical Garden opened to public.
 1892 – Zagreb Glavni railway station built.
 1893 – Funicular begins operating.
 1895 – Croatian National Theatre opened, during the visit of Emperor Franz Joseph.
 1898
 Art Pavilion inaugurated.
 Krvavi Most bridge closes. The bridge today remains as a pedestrian street, as the Medveščak stream, which used to flow under, was covered and built over.
 1900 – Population: 57,930 (61,002 with garrison).

20th century
 1901
Earthquake.
Taxi service established.
Women are allowed to enroll at the Faculty of Philosophy of the University of Zagreb.
 1903 – Observatory inaugurated.
 1904 – Kallina House (residence) built.
 1905 – National Gallery for Croatian Art established.
 1906 – Works on introducing street lighting begin.
 1907
 City Museum established.
 Electric power plant built.
 1909
 Airfield begins operating near Črnomerec.
 Zagreb Fair established (as Zagrebački zbor).
 1910 – Electric tramway begins operating.
 1912 – Stadion Maksimir opens.
 1918 
 City becomes part of the newly established Kingdom of Serbs, Croats and Slovenes
 1918 protest in Zagreb against the new kingdom (December Victims)
 1919
 Zagreb Quartet founded.
 Ethnographic Museum founded.
 1921 – Stadion Concordije built.
 1922
 City becomes capital of Zagreb Oblast.
 Archdiocesan Grand Gymnasium founded.
 1924
 Stadion Koturaska built.
 NK Maksimir football club formed.
 1925
 Zoo opens.
 Regent Esplanade hotel built.
 1926 – Radio-stanica Zagreb (now Croatian Radio) begins broadcasting.
 1931 – Population: 185,581.
 1937 – Gypsotheque founded.
 1938
 Mestrovic Pavilion and Sava Bridge built.
 V Gymnasium established.
 1939 – Archaeological Museum established.
 1940 – Vjesnik newspaper begins publication.
 1941
 City designated capital of Independent State of Croatia.
 September 14: Sabotage at the General Post Office.
 1942 – University Hospital established.
 1944 – 1945 - Bombing by Allied forces.
 1945 – Mladost sports society is founded.
 1946 – KK Cibona is founded (as Sloboda).
 1952 – Peasant Art Gallery founded.
 1953
 Privredni vjesnik business newspaper begins publication.
 Population: 350,452.
 1954
 Technical Museum and City Gallery of Contemporary Art founded.
 Gavella Drama Theatre opens.
 1958
 City government relocates to Stjepan Radic Square.
 1 Ilica Street and Jankomir Bridge built.
 1959
 Liberty Bridge opens.
 Večernji list newspaper begins publication.
 1 Ilica Street skyscraper is completed.
 1961 – Music Biennale Zagreb begins.
 1962
 Zagreb Airport begins operating.
 Glas Koncila Catholic newspaper begins publication.
 1964
 1964 Zagreb flood, the biggest flooding disaster in the city's history.
 Presidential Palace built.
 XV Gymnasium founded.
 1967 – Golden Spin of Zagreb ice skating competition begins.
 1972
 Animafest Zagreb begins.
 Dom Sportova built.
 1973
 Vatroslav Lisinski Concert Hall opens.
 Zagreb TV Tower built.
 1974
 August 30: Train disaster.
 Mamutica residential apartment complex and Youth Bridge built.
 1976
 SFera science fiction society formed.
 Zagrepčanka built.
 1981
 Adriatic Bridge opens.
 Population: 649,586.
 1982
 Klovićevi dvori art gallery opens.
 Podsused Bridge built.
 1983 – SFeraKon science fiction convention begins.
 1984 – Radio 101 begins broadcasting.
 1987
 City hosts Summer Universiade.
 Mimara Museum opens.
 Cibona Tower, Zagreb Mosque, and Cibona Sports Center built.
 1988 – Clinical Hospital Dubrava founded.
 1989 – Chromos Tower built.
 1990
 May 5: Eurovision Song Contest 1990
 May 13: Dinamo Zagreb–Red Star Belgrade riot.
 The Constitution of Croatia designates Zagreb as the capital of the Republic of Croatia.
 Slobodni tjednik newspaper begins publication.
 Globus, the most influential political weekly during the Independence war begins publication at the end of December.
 1991
 Zagreb Stock Exchange formed.
 October 4: Bombing of Zagreb TV Tower.
 October 7: Bombing of Banski dvori.
 December 7: Murder of the Zec family
 1995
 Zagreb crisis begins.
 May – Rocket attacks by Serbian forces.
 New building of the National and University Library is opened.
 1996
 Radio Student begins broadcasting.
 November: Protest against Radio 101 closure.
 Marina Matulović-Dropulić becomes the first female mayor of Zagreb.
 1998 – Jutarnji list newspaper begins publication.
 1999 – International Piano Competition Svetislav Stančić begins.
 2000
 Milan Bandić becomes mayor.
 Amadeo Theatre and Music Company founded.
 Stadion NŠC Stjepan Spajić built.

21st century

 2001 – Political Science Research Center founded.
 2002
 Zagreb Pride march begins.
 Vlasta Pavić becomes mayor.
 Zagreb School of Economics and Management founded.
 2003
 Zagreb Film Festival begins.
 Nedjeljni Jutarnji weekly newspaper begins publication.
 2004
 Poslovni dnevnik business newspaper begins publication.
 Zagrebacka Televizija begins broadcasting.
 HOTO Tower built.
 2005
 Milan Bandic becomes mayor again.
 24sata newspaper begins publication.
 ZagrebDox film festival begins.
 Serbian Orthodox Secondary School founded.
 2006
 INmusic festival begins.
 Eurotower and Zagrebtower built.
 2007
 Homeland Bridge opens.
 Zagreb Jewish Film Festival begins.
 2008
 Subversive Film Festival begins.
 October 23: assassination of Ivo Pukanić.
 Arena Zagreb built.
 2009
 Museum of Contemporary Art opens.
 2010 – Museum of Broken Relationships established.
 2011
 Population: 790,017.
 Lauba art gallery established.
 2012
 Sky Office Tower built.
 2013
 2013 European Figure Skating Championships
 2014
 xCimos tower built
 New building of the Academy of Music completed.
 2015
 Strojarska Business Center completed.
 2016
 Population: 802,338
 2019
 []
 2020
 A strong earthquake causes widespread damage and injuries.
 []

See also
 History of Zagreb
 List of mayors of Zagreb
 Timeline of Croatian history
 Timelines of other cities in Croatia: Rijeka, Split

References

Bibliography

External links
 Europeana. Items related to Zagreb, various dates.

 
 
Zagreb
Zagreb
Zagreb